"We're Gonna Make It" is a 1965 R&B single written by Gene Barge, Billy Davis, Raynard Miner & Carl William Smith, and performed by Little Milton. The single is the only Top 40 entry of Little Milton's career and his highest charting R&B single, spending three weeks at number one on the U.S. R&B chart.

Song Background
The lyrics of the song offer a civil-rights metaphor, depicting the signs of the time period in which the song was released.

Cover Versions
The song was later covered by Millie Jackson on her 1982 album Hard Times.

Chart positions

References

1965 singles
1965 songs
Song articles with missing songwriters
Songs written by Gene Barge
Songs written by Billy Davis (songwriter)